

See also
LGBT rights by country or territory — current legal status around the world
LGBT social movements — historical and contemporary movements

External links

 
LGBT
Tables of years